The Minnesota Senate, District 7, is located in St. Louis County and centered on the city of Duluth. It is currently represented by DFLer Jen McEwen.

List of senators

References 

Minnesota Senate districts
St. Louis County, Minnesota
Duluth, Minnesota